John I Komnenos Axouchos was Emperor of Trebizond from 1235 to 1238. One editor reads the text of the chronicle of Michael Panaretos as stating that John ruled six years; although William Miller follows Fallmerayer in assuming this was a mistake for three years, another possible solution is that John was co-ruler with his predecessor Andronikos I Gidos for three years then ruled alone for three more.

Background 
He was the eldest son of Alexios I of Trebizond and a woman the primary sources do not identify; some writers have named her Theodora Axuchina. Miller suggests that he was perhaps a minor at the time of his father's death in 1222, for his father was succeeded by the throne passed to Alexis' son-in-law, Andronikos I Gidos. During the Siege of Sinope, one of the sources states that Alexios has "grown sons in Trebizond who are capable of governing", so it is clear John was born before 1214.

Reign and death 
Little is recorded of John's reign, except that John died while playing tzykanion, a variant of polo fashionable among the Byzantine nobility, when he fell from his horse and was trampled to death. His heir apparent was one Ioannikios, who was confined to a monastery and John's second brother Manuel I ascended the throne. Since Fallmerayer, most historians have assume that Ioannikios was John Axouchos' son, but Panaretos' Chronicle does not state how Ioannikios was related to John Axouchos. Rustam Shukurov has argued that Ioannikios was the brother of both John and Manuel.

Whether John I issued the silver coins, or aspers, is disputed since some recent authorities believe the coins attributed to him better fit with the aspers struck during John II Megas Komnenos on numismatic grounds.

References

External links 
Vougiouklaki Penelope, "John I Grand Komnenos", Encyclopedia of the Hellenic World: Asia Minor

13th-century emperors of Trebizond
Grand Komnenos dynasty
Deaths by horse-riding accident
Year of birth missing
1238 deaths
Eastern Orthodox monarchs
Axouch family